Guru Angad Dev Veterinary and Animal Sciences University is a veterinary university in ludhiana Punjab, india. It was a part of Punjab Agricultural University and was established on 9 August 2005 to serve the society by promoting the livestock production, health and prevention of diseases through integrated teaching and extension programs. The mission of the college is to produce veterinary graduates, scientists and extension workers for promoting better livestock health, by prevention of disease, increasing production and reproduction of livestock, thus improving the quality of rural life in Punjab.

Facilities
The university has a veterinary teaching hospital to cater the demands of large and small animal health and provide specialized treatment for the referred livestock patients and also provide clinical training to the students. In addition the college also has dairy and poultry farms which provide facilities for teaching and research.

There are boys and girls hostels for students as well an auditorium and sports centre within the campus.

Academics and courses 
The university conducts research and academic initiatives at national and international levels and in collaboration with institutions such as such as National Dairy Research Institute, Karnal and University of Saskatchewan, Canada. Various Training and Conferences are organized for different disciplines in collaboration with ICAR, ASCI and Pradhan Mantri Kaushal Vikas Yojana

More than 20 courses are offered in various stream including B.V.Sc. and A.H. All these courses include undergraduate, post graduate and doctoral courses. It also awards post graduate diplomas in many fields. It also offers B.F.Sc. (Bachelor of Fisheries Science), B.Tech. (Dairy Technology) and B.Tech. (Biotechnology Engg.). It offers Ph.D. in many subjects including Veterinary Science, Animal Biotechnology, Fisheries and Dairy Science and Technology.

University library 
The university library has facility to collect, evaluate and organize information resources that support the curricula of the colleges, the research programmes and the general informational needs of the university.

Faculties
Animal Biotechnology 
Animal Breeding & Genetics   
Animal Nutrition   
Animal Reproduction, Gynecology and Obstetrics   
Livestock Production and Management   
Veterinary Anatomy and Histology   
Veterinary and Animal Husbandry Extension   
Veterinary Biochemistry   
Veterinary Clinical Services   
Veterinary Physiology   
Veterinary Microbiology   
Veterinary Epidemiology and Preventive Medicine   
Veterinary Pharmacology and Toxicology   
Veterinary Parasitology   
Veterinary Medicine, Jurisprudence and Ethics   
Veterinary Public Health   
Livestock Products Technology   
Veterinary Surgery and Radiology   
Veterinary Pathology
Dairy Microbiology
Dairy Engineering
Dairy Chemistry
Dairy Technology
Livestock Economics

External links
Guru Angad Dev Veterinary and Animal Sciences University

Veterinary schools in India
Universities in Punjab, India
Education in Ludhiana
Science and technology in Ludhiana
Educational institutions established in 2005
2005 establishments in Punjab, India